José Saldaña Tovar (born September 18, 1947) is a Peruvian politician. He is a former Congressman, elected in the 2006 elections, representing Huancavelica for the period 2006–2011, and belongs to the Union for Peru party.

References

External links
Curriculum vitae 

Living people
1947 births
Union for Peru politicians
Possible Peru politicians
Members of the Congress of the Republic of Peru

National Solidarity Party (Peru) politicians